Soen is a Swedish progressive metal supergroup. Their debut album Cognitive was released on 15 February 2012.

History
Initially formed in 2004, it was in May 2010 that the formation of Soen was announced. The original lineup consisted of former Opeth drummer Martin Lopez, ex-Death, Testament and Sadus bassist Steve Di Giorgio, Willowtree vocalist Joel Ekelöf and guitarist Joakim Platbarzdis.
The group's first song, "Fraccions", was released on the band's official website in October 2010. Their first video, for the song "Savia", was posted on their Facebook page in February 2012. Their second video is a moody acoustic version of the song "Ideate". The band's third video is for the song "Delenda".

Drummer Martin Lopez has described Soen's music as "melodic, heavy, intricate and very different than everything else." Their debut, Cognitive, was released in February 2012 receiving positive critical reception.  The members' technical proficiency was praised the most, though many reviewers noted extreme stylistic similarities to the music of Tool.
Martin Lopez commented on the Tool similarity: "We are inspired by Tool but I consider them not only a band but a genre. Besides that, I really don't think there's anything to argue about, we make good music whoever it would remind you of. Some people tend to dislike rather than like and are looking for faults instead of seeing music for what it is, good or bad".

Cognitive was released on Spinefarm records on 15 February 2012. The album was mixed by David Bottrill (Tool, Coheed and Cambria, Silverchair, Smashing Pumpkins, Muse, etc.) and mastered by João Carvalho. There is also a bonus track on the Japanese edition called "Writhen". Soen's second album, Tellurian was released on 4 November 2014. The album was produced by Platbarzdis, mixed again by David Bottrill and mastered at Bob Ludwig's Gateway setup in the U.S. by Adam Ayan. Lykaia is the third album released by Soen on 3 February 2017. The whole album was recorded using analog equipment.

Lotus is the fourth album released by Soen on 1 February 2019.

Their fifth album, Imperial, was released on 29 January 2021.

Members

Current members 
 Martín López – drums, percussion (2010–present)
 Joel Ekelöf – vocals (2010–present)
 Lars Åhlund – keyboards, guitars, backing vocals (2014–present)
 Cody Lee Ford – guitars, backing vocals (2018–present)
 Oleksii 'Zlatoyar' Kobel – bass (2020–present)

Former members 
 Steve Di Giorgio – bass (2010–2013)
 Joakim Platbarzdis – guitars (2010–2015)
 Stefan Stenberg – bass (2013–2020)
 Marcus Jidell – guitars (2015–2018)

Session members 
 Christian Andolf – bass
 Inti Oyarzún – bass

Timeline

Discography

Studio albums

Live albums

Singles and music videos
 "Savia" (2012)
 "Delenda" (2012)
 "Tabula Rasa" (2014)
 "The Words" (2014)
 "Lucidity" (2017)
 "Opal" (2017)
 "Rival" (2018)
 "Martyrs" (2018)
 "Lotus" (2019)
 "Covenant" (2019)
 "Antagonist" (2020)
 "Monarch" (2020)
 "Illusion" (2021)

References

External links

Heavy metal supergroups
Musical groups established in 2010
Musical quartets
Swedish progressive metal musical groups
2010 establishments in Sweden